Sadeq (in ) is an Arab and Iranian given name and surname which is most common in Iran, Pakistan, and Arab countries. Sadegh is the Iranian variant. Other variants include Sadiq.

Notable people with the name include:

Titular
Sadeq Khan, a Faujdar of the Mughal Bengal's Sylhet Sarkar
Sadeq Mohammad Khan IV, 10th Nawab of Bahawalpur who ruled the Bahawalpur State
Sadeq Khan Zand (died 1781), also known as Mohammad Sadeq, the fifth Shah of the Zand dynasty from 1779 to 1781

Given name
Sadeq Ali, Bengali writer, poet and district judge from 19th century
Sadeq Amin Abu Rass, Yemeni politician, Chairperson of the Sana'a-based General People’s Congress
Sadeq Chubak, sometimes Sādegh Choubak (1916–1998), Iranian author of short fiction, drama, and novels
Sadeq Khalilian (born 1959), Iranian economist, academic, politician and government minister
Sadeq Kia (1920–2002), Iranian man of letters, professor of Iranian languages 
Sadeq Larijani (born 1961), better known as Amoli Larijani, Iranian cleric, conservative politician
Sadeq Naihoum (1937–1994), Libyan writer and journalist
Sadeq Rohani, or Grand Ayatollah Sayyid Mohammad Sadeq Hussaini Rohani, Iranian Twelver Shia Marja
Sadeq Sayeed (born 1953), Pakistani-born banker and businessman
Sadeq Tabatabaei (1943–2015), Iranian writer, journalist, TV host, university professor

Middle name
Ahmed Sadeq Al Khamri (born 1992), Yemeni footballer
Ali Sadeq Benwan (born 1991), Iraqi footballer
Mohammad Mohammad Sadeq al-Sadr (1943–1999), Iraqi Twelver Shi'a cleric of the rank of Grand Ayatollah

Surname
Hamed Sadeq (born 1971), Kuwaiti sprinter

Village
Sadeq, Iran, Sadeq (Persian: صادق, also Romanized as Şādeq) is a village in Ahudasht Rural District, Shavur District, Shush County, Khuzestan Province, Iran.

See also
Sadegh (disambiguation)
Sadek (disambiguation)
Sadiq (disambiguation)
Siddiq (name)
Siddique (disambiguation)